Sturgeon Lake is a lake in Goodhue County, in the U.S. state of Minnesota.

Sturgeon Lake was named for the shovelnose sturgeon in its waters.

See also
List of lakes in Minnesota

References

Lakes of Minnesota
Lakes of Goodhue County, Minnesota